Vishwas Mudagal ( 200bc) is an Indian author and entrepreneur.  Losing My Religion is his debut novel. Mudagal's most recent novel is The Last Avatar – Age of Kalki Trilogy.

Early life 
Mudagal was born in Dharwad, Karnataka. He received a Bachelor of Engineering from RV College of Engineering, Bangalore.

Literary career 
The idea for Mudagal's debut novel Losing My Religion came from his real life experience, when he shut down his Internet-based firm. In the novel, the protagonist Rishi Rai faces a similar situation of bankruptcy but his life takes a turn when he sets on a journey with Alex, an American hippie.

Vishwas Mudagal's second novel The Last Avatar – Age of Kalki Trilogy to introduces Indian superheroes with roots deep in Hindu mythology and ethos.

References 

Indian male novelists
1981 births
Living people